"Selamanya Cinta" is a song recorded by Malaysian singer-songwriter Shila Amzah and Malaysian singer Alif Satar, taken from Shila's sixth and debut Chinese-language studio album, My Journey (2016). It was released on July 14, 2016, through Sony Music Malaysia (streaming) and July 15, 2016, through Shila Amzah Entertainment Berhad (digital download and streaming). The song was solely written by Shila Amzah and produced by Helen Yap with Shila's aid. The song was released as a single after My Journey was released in China on April 30, 2016, through her Hong Kong management label, Shilala (HK) Limited.

Format and track listing 
Digital download

1    "Selamanya Cinta" – 4:12

Credits and personnel 
Recording and management 
 Recorded and mixed at NAR Records (Kuala Lumpur, Malaysia)
 Mastered at Sterling Sound (New York City, United States of America)
 Shilala (HK) Limited, Shila Amzah Entertainment Berhad, Sony Music Malaysia
Personnel
 Shila Amzah – lead vocals, writer, producer 
 Alif Satar – lead vocals
 Helen Yap – producer, arranger, keyboards
 Jamie Wilson – guitar
 Ujang Exist – drums
 Bong Kamal Ali – bass
 Lim Jae Sern – strings
 Yap Yen – strings
 Veronika Thoene – strings
 Nasran Nawi – strings
 Amir Sulaiman – recording, mixing
 Tom Coyne – mastering
Credits are adapted from Helen Yap's Instagram post.

Release history

References

2016 singles
2016 songs
Shila Amzah songs
Song recordings produced by Shila Amzah
Songs written by Shila Amzah